Dr. Sarah E. Kreps is an American political scientist, United States Air Force veteran, and policy analyst who focuses on U.S. foreign and defense policy. She is a professor of government at Cornell University, adjunct professor of law at Cornell Law School, and an adjunct scholar at West Point's Modern War Institute.

She is the author of four books, including two on drones, another on U.S. military interventions after the Cold War, and the most recent on how the United States pays for its wars.  She is a life member of the Council on Foreign Relations, and her writing has appeared in The Washington Post, International Herald Tribune, The New York Times, USA Today, CNBC, Axios, and CNN, among other outlets.

Military 
Sarah Kreps was a foreign area officer for European and Sub-Saharan African affairs from 1999-2003. She worked as a consultant for the Ministry of Defence (United Kingdom) and NATO from 2003-2004 and as an analyst for the National Reconnaissance Office from 2003-2005. Since then, she has worked as an advisor for the United States Institute of Peace and as an executive consultant for the United States Department of Homeland Security.

Books

 Taxing Wars: The American Way of War Finance and the Decline of Democracy (Oxford University Press, 2018)
 Drones: What Everyone Needs to Know (Oxford University Press, 2016)
 Drone Warfare (Polity Press, 2014; co-authored with John Kaag)
 Coalitions of Convenience: United States Military Interventions after the Cold War (Oxford University Press, 2011)

References

External links 
 Personal website
 New York Times Opinionator author page
 Interview with the Council on Foreign Relations
 

Living people
1976 births
American women political scientists
American political scientists
Cornell University faculty
Harvard University alumni
Georgetown University alumni
Alumni of the University of Oxford
American women academics
21st-century American women